Hard to Kill is the second studio album by American rapper Gucci Mane. It was released on October 24, 2006 via Big Cat Records and Tommy Boy Records. Production was mainly handled by Zaytoven, except for four tracks which were produced by Cyber Sapp, Nitti, Josh Butler, Chead George and Paul Roach. The album features guest appearances from Black Magic, Mac Bre-Z, Gangsta Boo, Jason Caesar, La Chat and Young Snead.

The album was supported by the single "Freaky Gurl", which was sent to radio on September 11, 2007.

Critical reception 
The album received mixed reviews. Paul Cantor of XXL said that although the album's guest appearances help "break the monotony", it was "a laborious listen".

Track listing

Charts

References

External links

2006 albums
Gucci Mane albums
Albums produced by Zaytoven